Nash Central High School is a Nash-Rocky Mount public high school located on the western edge of Rocky Mount, North Carolina and a member of the Eastern Plains 2-Athletic Conference.  As of 2009–2010, Nash Central is home to over 1,200 students, 79 full-time educators—of which 32 have either earned an advanced degree (Master's or Ph.D.) or are certified by the National Board for Professional Teaching Standards—as well the personnel employed in administration, guidance and support positions.

In 2010, the U.S. News & World Report named Nash Central High a "Best High Schools in America" Bronze Medal School.

History
Nash Central High was the most recent high school addition to the Nash-Rocky Mount Public School System when it opened in 2002. Currently Rocky Mount High School is the most recent high school building to have been built.  Nash Central graduated its first class in 2005.
The first principal of Nash Central High School was LeRoy Hartsfield (2002-2010), followed by Craig Harris (2010–2012), Gail Powers (2012–2015), and now current principal Victor Ward (2015–present).

Campus
School facilities feature computers and internet access in 100% of the classrooms.  The building is a two-story brick complex spotlighted by a high-ceilinged glass-walled library and 300 seat cafeteria of similar architecture. Nash Central Pond is accentuated by an illuminated fountain, a gift from the class of 2005. Sports facilities include a 1,500 seat gymnasium, 6 tennis courts, baseball and softball fields, a soccer field and a 4,000 seat football stadium with track.

Community involvement
Nash Central is a member of the School Improvement Council, The Southern Association of Colleges, and the Business/Education Partnership Program with the Special Olympics, The Band/Chorus Booster Club, The Athletic Booster Club, Harris Teeter, Food Lion, Target, and EP Mart.

Extracurricular activities

Athletics
Nash Central is a member of the 2-A Eastern Plains Athletic Conference and offers a variety of sports including:

Fall sports:
Boys' cross country
Girls' cross country
Junior varsity and varsity football
Girls' golf
Boys' soccer
Girls' tennis
Junior varsity and varsity volleyball
Junior varsity and varsity cheerleading
Winter sports:
Boys' junior varsity and varsity basketball
Girls' junior varsity and varsity basketball
Boys' indoor track and field
Girls' indoor track and field
Boys' swimming
Girls' swimming
wrestling
Spring sports:
Junior varsity and varsity baseball
Girls' golf
Girls' soccer
Junior varsity and varsity softball
Boys' tennis
Boys' outdoor track and field
Girls' outdoor track and field

References

External links
 Nash Central High School
 

Educational institutions established in 2002
Public high schools in North Carolina
Schools in Nash County, North Carolina
2002 establishments in North Carolina